Paracolobus is an extinct genus of primate closely related to the living colobus monkeys. It lived in eastern Africa in the Pliocene and Early Pleistocene. Fossils have been found in Kenya and Ethiopia, in places such as the Omo valley.

Description
Compared to another giant monkey Cercopithecoides, Paracolobus  had a longer face and deeper jaws. It had a longer cranium, broader muzzle, wider face and longer nasal bone than its closest relative, the extinct Rhinocolobus. Its dentition was similar to modern colobus monkeys, indicating a largely folivorous diet. Despite its large size, it was probably arboreal like its modern relatives.

References

Literature cited
McKenna, M.C. and Bell, S.K. 1997. Classification of Mammals: Above the species level. New York: Columbia University Press, 631 pp. 

Colobinae
Pliocene primates
Pleistocene primates
Pliocene mammals of Africa
Pleistocene mammals of Africa
Prehistoric primate genera
Fossil taxa described in 1969
Taxa named by Richard Leakey